Deputy Marshal of the Senate of the Republic of Poland is one of the Polish Senators in the upper house of the Polish parliament who serves as the deputy of the Senate Marshal (speaker). There could be a maximum of four Deputy Marshals.

Deputy Marshals are allowed to preside over the Senate sessions when the Marshal does not preside.

They are elected among the Senators for a full Senate term, alongside the Marshal.

List

1st term (1989–1991)
 Zofia Kuratowska (Solidarity)
 Józef Ślisz (Solidarity)
 Andrzej Wielowieyski (Solidarity)

Under Marshal Andrzej Stelmachowski

2nd term (1991–1993)
 Andrzej Czapski (Liberal Democratic Congress)
 Alicja Grześkowiak (Centre Agreement)
 Józef Ślisz (People's Christian Party)

Under Marshal August Chełkowski

3rd term (1993–1997)
 Ryszard Czarny (Democratic Left Alliance)
 Stefan Jurczak (Solidarity)
 Zofia Kuratowska (Democratic Union, Freedom Union)
 Grzegorz Kurczuk (Democratic Left Alliance)

Under Marshal Adam Struzik

4th term (1997–2001)
 Tadeusz Rzemykowski (Democratic Left Alliance)
 Donald Tusk (Freedom Union)
 Marcin Tyrna (Solidarity Electoral Action) – since 3 October 2000
 Andrzej Chronowski (Solidarity Electoral Action) – until 3 October 2000

Under Marshal Alicja Grześkowiak

5th term (2001–2005)
 Jolanta Danielak (Democratic Left Alliance)
 Ryszard Jarzembowski (Democratic Left Alliance)
 Kazimierz Kutz (Senate 2001 coalition)

Under Marshal Longin Pastusiak

6th term (2005–2007)
 Ryszard Legutko (Law and Justice)
 Maciej Płażyński (Independent)
 Krzysztof Putra (Law and Justice)
 Marek Aleksander Ziółkowski (Civic Platform) – since 22 December 2005

Under Marshal Bogdan Borusewicz

7th term (2007-2011)
 Krystyna Bochenek (Civic Platform)-until 10 April 2010
 Marek Aleksander Ziółkowski (Civic Platform)
 Zbigniew Romaszewski (Law and Justice)
 Grażyna Sztark (Civic Platform)- since 17 November 2010
Under Marshal Bogdan Borusewicz

8th term (2011-2015)
 Jan Wyrowiński (Civic Platform)
 Maria Pańczyk-Pozdziej (Civic Platform)
 Stanisław Karczewski (Law and Justice)
Under Marshal Bogdan Borusewicz

9th term (2015-2019) 
 Adam Bielan (Law and Justice)- until 28 May 2019
 Bogdan Borusewicz (Civic Platform)
 Grzegorz Czelej (Law and Justice)-until 20 April 2017
 Maria Koc (Law and Justice)
 Michał Seweryński (Law and Justice)-since 20 April 2017
 Marek Pęk (Law and Justice)- since 26 June 2019
Under Marshal Stanisław Karczewski

10th term (2019-present) 
 Bogdan Borusewicz (Civic Platform)
 Michał Kamiński (Union of European Democrats)
 Stanisław Karczewski (Law and Justice) - until 13 May 2020
 Gabriela Morawska-Stanecka (Polish Socialist Party)
 Marek Pęk (Law and Justice) - since 13 May 2020
Under Marshal Tomasz Grodzki

See also
 President pro tempore of the United States Senate

References

External links
 Senate official website (Polish)

Polish politicians
Legislative deputy speakers